Coventry Bees were a motorcycle speedway team that existed from 1929 to 2018. They raced at Brandon Stadium, Brandon near Coventry, England.

History

A Coventry team was first formed in 1928 and competed in the inaugural season of the Southern League and then the National League from 1932 during the pre-war era at Brandon stadium. There were also meetings at a stadium at the Lythalls Lane Stadium. After the war, the club became The Bees and were involved every season from 1948 until the loss of Brandon stadium shortly before the start of the 2017 season, during which they ran a series of challenge matches at other tracks.

Although the club have won the now defunct Midland Cup eleven times, the first silverware won at national level by the club was the 1953 Speedway National League Division Two league title. The first major trophy was becoming league champions of the Great Britain during the 1968 British League season. They went on to become League champions in 1968, 1978, 1979, 1987, 1988, 2005 and 2007 and 2010. In 2010, they won the Elite League Championship, defeating the Poole Pirates in both legs of the play-off grand finals. 

On 28 October 2007, the Bees lifted the Elite League Knockout Cup for the second year running, defeating the Swindon Robins in the final, completing a clean sweep of all three major trophies, having already annexed the Craven Shield by beating Swindon Robins and the Poole Pirates over the three leg final. This was their third Knockout Cup success. 

On 24 November 2010, following changes to the rules for rider averages made at the Annual General Meeting of the BSPA, the Coventry Bees and Peterborough Panthers walked out of the meeting. As a result, on 27 November, the BSPA omitted both teams from the 2011 Elite League for failing to declare their intent to compete in the 2011 league at the AGM. Two months later on 17 February 2011, it was announced by the BSPA that both Coventry and Peterborough would not be competing in the Elite League after both clubs rejected an offer On 8 April 2011, the BSPA officially confirmed both teams had returned to the Elite League for the 2011 season. 

On 11 August 2011, Edward Kennett resigned from the team, after it was deemed his silencer was 'illegal' when racing against Lakeside on 6 August. Kennett said this was caused by 'a member of his team' who had 'tampered with it'. Kennett was banned from racing for 7 days by the SCB  and appeared in front of a disciplinary hearing on 16 August where he received a 6-month worldwide ban.

On 21 September 2011, the Bees were put up for sale by owner Avtar Sandhu and then taken over by businessman Mick Horton, with the promotional licence held jointly by Colin Pratt and Mick Horton.

Closure 
On 26 February 2017 it was announced by the BSPA that the club has had its licence frozen and therefore would not be competing in the Speedway Great Britain Premiership 2017 season. The licence being frozen was due to the club being unable to satisfy the BSPA that they can fulfil a full season of league racing. This was primarily due to having an agreement with Leicester Lions to only use their stadium for a handful of fixtures and not having any guarantees of being able to return to Brandon Stadium for the remaining fixtures.

The Bees were reformed to compete in the 2018 National League, with home meetings being staged at Leicester. The Bees became homeless once more in 2019 as the Leicester promotion decided to run their own National League junior team (The Cubs). Brandon Stadium today lies derelict with several planning applications having been made for redevelopment. Many club enthusiasts, supported by the local council, have campaigned for the return of speedway and stock car racing to the stadium.

In early 2022, an organization advocating the return of motorsport to the site, Save Coventry Speedway, proposed to the council that speedway be restored to the stadium, along with a museum and restaurant. Brandon Estates maintained plans to build a housing development, stating that speedway at the stadium is currently not "financially viable."

Notable riders

Season summary

Season summary (juniors)

Coventry Storm made their competitive debut in the 2013 National League season. The Bees had previously run a team in the third tier of British speedway in 2004, under the name Coventry Cougars. The initial team line-up was Joe Jacobs, James Sarjeant, Oliver Greenwood, Brendan Johnson, Richard Franklin, Trevor Heath, and Martin Knuckey, but a broken wrist for Greenwood saw Robert Branford replace him, with Tommy Fenwick also replacing Heath.

References

External links

Sport in Coventry
Speedway Elite League teams